Schwenck is a surname.

Notable people with the name include:
Cléber Schwenck Tiene (born 1979, known as Schwenck), Brazilian footballer
Rudy Schwenck (1884-1941), American baseball player
Sir William Schwenck Gilbert (1836-1911), English dramatist and librettist of Gilbert and Sullivan operas
Mary Schwenck (born 1778), aunt of William Gilbert, the librettists's father, and  godmother to the librettist

See also
 Christian Friedrich Gottlieb Schwencke, German composer, source of the Schwencke measure
 Schwenk
 Schwenke (disambiguation)

References